Asendia Management SAS is a cross-border delivery service for international e-commerce and mail. A joint venture of French La Poste and Swiss Post since 2012, the company acts under the brand "Asendia" and has 32 global locations in 4 continents, delivering worldwide.  The business handles all aspects of international e-commerce and mail logistics, including delivery, customs, fulfillment and returns. 

Asendia is owner of esw. (formally eShopWorld) after acquiring full ownership in 2021.  The company is also an investor in Anchanto, a market leader in e-commerce technology in Asia.  In January 2022, Asendia announced a partnership with DPDgroup for a better USA to Europe e-commerce delivery solution. 

Asendia has over 1,500 employees worldwide  and is present in Europe, Oceania, Asia and North America through 32 offices in 16 countries: Australia, Austria, Belgium, China, Denmark, France, Germany, Italy, the Netherlands, Norway, Singapore, Spain, Sweden, Switzerland, the United Kingdom and the United States of America. 

In 2022, Asendia announced that the company had become 100% carbon neutral offsetting end-to-end client delivery, plus their own office, travel, and equipment emissions.

References 

Logistics companies of France
Postal organizations
Logistics companies of Switzerland
Companies established in 2012